Hoppipola may refer to:

 "Hoppípolla", a song by Icelandic post-rock band Sigur Rós
 Hoppipolla, a chain of bars owned by Speciality Restaurants Limited